Qinglongqiao railway station (also known as Ching-lung-chiao railway station) is a historic station of Jingbao Railway located in Badaling Town, Yanqing District, Beijing. It was built in 1908, and includes the famous zigzag railway designed by the Chinese railroad engineer Zhan Tianyou (Jeme Tien-Yow). The station also contains the tomb of Zhan Tianyou and a statue of his, along with milestones in Suzhou numerals.

Note that there are two stations at Qinglongqiao. Only in the southbound direction do the trains use the eastern switchback, reversing at Qinglongqiao railway station.

See also
 List of stations on Jingbao railway

References

Railway stations in Beijing
Railways with Zig Zags